Ben Hill Brown Jr. (February 8, 1914May 25, 1989) was the United States Ambassador to Liberia from 1964 to 1969.

Early life
Brown was born on February 8, 1914, in Spartanburg, South Carolina to parents Ben Hill and Clara Twitty Brown. His father was the mayor of Spartanburg in 1937.

Military career
Brown served in the United States Army in World War II.

Professional career

Brown was a lawyer. Brown was appointed by President Lyndon B. Johnson to the position of United States Ambassador to Liberia on November 25, 1964. The presentation of his credentials occurred on January 6, 1965. He remained in this position until July 17, 1969.

Personal life
Brown was a member of multiple fraternities such as Phi Delta Phi and Kappa Alpha Order. Brown was also a Freemason. Brown was Episcopalian.

Death
Brown died on May 25, 1989, at the age of 75 of cancer in Georgetown University Hospital, Washington, D.C. His residence was in Alexandria, Virginia at the time of his death. He was interred at Rock Creek Cemetery.

References

1914 births
1989 deaths
People from Spartanburg County, South Carolina
Ambassadors of the United States to Liberia
American Freemasons
United States Army personnel of World War II
Military personnel from South Carolina
Deaths from cancer in Washington, D.C.
Episcopalians from South Carolina
20th-century American Episcopalians
20th-century American diplomats
20th-century American lawyers